Narcissistic personality disorder (NPD) is a personality disorder characterized by a life-long pattern of exaggerated feelings of self-importance, an excessive need for admiration, a diminished ability or unwillingness to empathize with others' feelings, and interpersonally exploitative behavior. Narcissistic personality disorder is one of the sub-types of the broader category known as personality disorders. It is often comorbid with other mental disorders and associated with significant functional impairment and psychosocial disability.

Personality disorders are a class of mental disorders characterized by enduring and inflexible maladaptive patterns of behavior, cognition, and inner experience, exhibited across many contexts and deviating from those accepted by any culture. These patterns develop by early adulthood, and are associated with significant distress or impairment. Criteria for diagnosing personality disorders are listed in the sixth chapter of the International Classification of Diseases (ICD) and in the American Psychiatric Association's Diagnostic and Statistical Manual of Mental Disorders (DSM).

There is no standard treatment for NPD. Its high comorbidity with other mental disorders influences treatment choice and outcomes. Psychotherapeutic treatments generally fall into two categories: psychoanalytic/psychodynamic and cognitive behavioral therapy, with growing support for integration of both in therapy. However, there is an almost complete lack of studies determining the effectiveness of treatments.

Signs and symptoms

DSM-5 
The Diagnostic and Statistical Manual of Mental Disorders, Fifth Edition (DSM-5) describes NPD as possessing at least five of the following nine criteria.

 A grandiose sense of self-importance
 Preoccupation with fantasies of unlimited success, power, brilliance, beauty, or ideal love
 Believing that they are "special" and unique and can only be understood by, or should associate with, other special or high-status people (or institutions)
 Requiring excessive admiration
 A sense of entitlement (unreasonable expectations of especially favorable treatment or automatic compliance with their expectations)
 Being interpersonally exploitative (taking advantage of others to achieve their own ends)
 Lacking empathy (unwilling to recognize or identify with the feelings and needs of others)
 Often being envious of others or believing that others are envious of them
 Showing arrogant, haughty behaviors or attitudes
Within the DSM-5, NPD is a cluster B personality disorder. Individuals with cluster B personality disorders often appear dramatic, emotional, or erratic. Narcissistic personality disorder is a mental disorder characterized by a life-long pattern of exaggerated feelings of self-importance, an excessive craving for admiration, and a diminished ability to empathize with others' feelings.

A diagnosis of NPD, like other personality disorders, is made by a qualified healthcare professional in a clinical interview. The process of diagnosis often involves asking the client to describe people emotionally close to them, which can reveal extreme arrogance or a lack of empathy.

Narcissistic personality disorder usually develops either in youth or in early adulthood. True symptoms of NPD are pervasive, apparent in varied social situations, and are rigidly consistent over time. Severe symptoms of NPD can significantly impair the person's mental capabilities to develop meaningful human relationships, such as friendship, kinship, and marriage. Generally, the symptoms of NPD also impair the person's psychological abilities to function socially, either at work or at school, or within important societal settings. The DSM-5 indicates that, in order to qualify as symptomatic of NPD, the person's manifested personality traits must substantially differ from social norms.

ICD-11 and ICD-10 

In the International Statistical Classification of Diseases and Related Health Problems, 11th Edition ICD-11 of the World Health Organization (WHO), all personality disorders are diagnosed under a single title called "personality disorder". The criteria for diagnosis are mainly concerned with assessing dysfunction, distress and maladaptive behavior. Once a diagnosis has been made, the clinician then can draw upon five trait domains to describe the particular causes of dysfunction, as these have major implications for potential treatments. NPD, as it currently conceptualised, would correspond more or less entirely to the ICD-11 trait of Dissociality, which includes self-centredness (grandiosity, attention-seeking, entitlement and egocentricity) and lack of empathy (callousness, ruthlessness, manipulativeness, interpersonal exploitativeness, and hostility).

In the previous edition, the ICD-10, narcissistic personality disorder (NPD) is listed under the category of "other specific personality disorders", meaning the ICD-10 required that cases otherwise described as NPD in the DSM-5 would only need to meet a general set of diagnostic criteria.

Associated features 
People with NPD exaggerate their skills, accomplishments, and their degree of intimacy with people they consider high-status. A sense of personal superiority may lead them to monopolize conversations, look down on others or to become impatient and disdainful when other persons talk about themselves. This behavior correlates to an overall worse functioning in areas of life like work and intimate romantic relationships.

People with NPD have been observed to use psychosocial strategies, such as the tendency to devalue and derogate and to insult and blame other people, usually with anger and hostility towards people's responses to their anti-social behavior. Narcissistic personalities are more likely to respond with anger or aggressiveness when presented with rejection. Some patients with NPD (see Subtypes) respond to (real or imagined) criticism or defeat with prone to feelings of shame, humiliation, and worthlessness, and usually mask such feelings from people, by feigning humility, responding with outbursts of rage and defiance, or seeking revenge.

The DSM-5 indicates that: "Many highly successful individuals display personality traits that might be considered narcissistic. Only when these traits are inflexible, maladaptive, and persisting, and cause significant functional impairment or subjective distress, do they constitute narcissistic personality disorder." Given the high-function sociability associated with narcissism, some people with NPD might not view such a diagnosis as a functional impairment to their lives. Although overconfidence tends to make people with NPD very ambitious, such a mindset does not necessarily lead to professional high achievement and success, because they refuse to take risks, in order to avoid failure or the appearance of failure. Moreover, the psychological inability to tolerate disagreement, contradiction, and criticism, makes it difficult for persons with NPD to work cooperatively or to maintain long-term, professional relationships with superiors and colleagues.

Differential diagnosis 
The occurrence of narcissistic personality disorder presents a high rate of comorbidity with other mental disorders. People with NPD are prone to bouts of psychological depression, often to the degree that meets the clinical criteria for a co-occurring depressive disorder. NPD is associated with the occurrence of bipolar disorder and substance use disorders, especially cocaine use disorder. NPD may also be comorbid or differentiated with the occurrence of other mental disorders, including histrionic personality disorder, borderline personality disorder, antisocial personality disorder, or paranoid personality disorder. NPD should also be differentiated from mania and hypomania as these cases can also present with grandiosity, but present with different levels of functional impairment. Narcissistic personality disorder differs from self-confidence which is associated with a strong sense of self. It is common for children and adolescents to display personality traits that resemble NPD, but such occurrences are usually transient, and register below the clinical criteria for a formal diagnosis of NPD.

Subtypes
Although the DSM-5 diagnostic criteria for NPD has been viewed as homogeneous, there are a variety of subtypes used for classification of NPD. There is poor consensus on how many subtypes exist, but there is broad acceptance that there are at least two: grandiose or overt narcissism, and vulnerable or covert narcissism. However, none of the subtypes of NPD are recognized in the DSM-5 or in the ICD-11.

Empirically-verified subtypes 
Some research has indicated the existence of three subtypes of NPD, which can be distinguished by symptom criteria, comorbidity and other clinical criteria. These are as follows:

Grandiose/Malignant: the group exhibits grandiosity, entitlement, interpersonal exploitativeness and manipulation, pursuit of power and control, lack of empathy and remorse, and marked irritability and hostility. This group was noted for high levels of comorbid antisocial and paranoid personality disorders, substance abuse, externalizing, unemployment and greater likelihood of violence. Of note, Russ et al. observed that this group "do not appear to suffer from underlying feelings of inadequacy or to be prone to negative affect states other than anger", an observation corroborated by recent research which found this variant to show strong inverse associations with depressive, anxious-avoidant, and dependant/victimised features.

Fragile/Covert: this variant is defined by feelings of shame, envy, resentment, and inferiority (which is occasionally "masked" by arrogance), entitlement, a belief that one is misunderstood or unappreciated, and excessive reactivity to slights or criticism. This variant is associated with elevated levels of psychological distress and comorbid depression, anxiety, and avoidant, borderline and dependent personality disorders.

High-Functioning/Exhibitionistic: this variant has been described as "high functioning narcissists [who] were grandiose, competitive, attention-seeking, and sexually provocative; they tended to show adaptive functioning and utilize their narcissistic traits to succeed." This group has been found to have relatively few psychological issues and high rates of obsessive-compulsive personality disorder, with excessive perfectionism posited as a potential cause for their impairment.

Others 
Communal Narcissism

A fourth type is the communal narcissist, who shares the same arrogance and self-motives, and sense of entitlement and grandiosity as the grandiose narcissist but seeks power and admiration in the communal realm. They see themselves as altruistic, saintly, caring, helpful, and warm.
Millon's Taxonomy

In the study Disorders of Personality: DSM-IV-TM and Beyond (1996), Theodore Millon suggested five subtypes of NPD, although they did not identify specific treatments per subtype.
Historical demarcation of grandiose and vulnerable types

Over the years, many clinicians and theorists have described two variants of NPD akin to the grandiose and vulnerable expressions of trait narcissism. Some examples include:

Assessment and screening

Narcissistic Personality Inventory 

Risk factors for NPD and grandiose/overt and vulnerable/covert subtypes are measured using the narcissistic personality inventory, an assessment tool originally developed in 1979, has undergone multiple iterations with new versions in 1984, 2006 and 2014. It captures principally grandiose narcissism, but also seems to capture elements of vulnerability. A popular three-factor model has it that grandiose narcissism is assessed via the Leadership/Authority and Grandiose/Exhibitionism facets, while a combination of grandiose and vulnerable traits are indexed by the Entitlement/Exploitativeness facet.

Pathological Narcissism Inventory 
The Pathological Narcissism Inventory (PNI) was designed to measure fluctuations in grandiose and vulnerable narcissistic states, similar to what is ostensibly observed by some clinicians (though empirical demonstration of this phenomenon is lacking). While having both "grandiosity" and vulnerability scales, empirically both seem to primarily capture vulnerable narcissism. 

The PNI scales show significant associations with parasuicidal behavior, suicide attempts, homicidal ideation, and several aspects of psychotherapy utilization.

Five-Factor Narcissism Inventory 
The Five-Factor Narcissism Inventory (FFNI) was defined as a comprehensive assay of grandiose and vulnerable expressions of trait narcissism. The scale measures 11 traits of grandiose narcissism and 4 traits of vulnerable narcissism, both of which correlate with clinical ratings of NPD (with grandiose features of arrogance, grandiose fantasies, manipulativeness, entitlement and exploitativeness showing stronger relations). Later analysis revealed that the FFNI actually measures three factors:

 Agentic Extraversion: an exaggerated sense of self-importance, grandiose fantasies, striving for greatness and acclaim, social dominance and authoritativeness, and exhibitionistic, charming interpersonal conduct.
 Self-Centred Antagonism: disdain for others, psychological entitlement, interpersonally exploitative and manipulative behaviour, lack of empathy, anger in response to criticism or rebuke, suspiciousness, and thrill-seeking.
 Narcissistic Neuroticism: shame-proneness, oversensitivity and negative emotionality to criticism and rebuke, and excessive need for admiration to maintain self-esteem.

Grandiose narcissism is a combination of agency and antagonism, and vulnerability is a combination of antagonism and neuroticism. The three factors show differential associations with clinically important variables. Agentic traits are associated with high self-esteem, positive view others and the future, autonomous and authentic living, commitment to personal growth, sense of purpose in life and life satisfaction. Neurotic traits show precisely the opposite correlation with all of these variables, while antagonistic traits show more complex associations; they are associated with negative view of others (but necessarily of the self), a sense of alienation from their 'true self', disinterest in personal growth, negative relationships with others, and all forms of aggression.

Millon Clinical Multiaxial Inventory 

The Millon Clinical Multiaxial Inventory (MCMI) is another diagnostic test developed by Theodore Millon. The MCMI includes a scale for narcissism. The NPI and MCMI have been found to be well correlated. Whereas the MCMI measures narcissistic personality disorder (NPD), the NPI measures narcissism as it occurs in the general population; the MCMI is a screening tool. In other words, the NPI measures "normal" narcissism; i.e., most people who score very high on the NPI do not have NPD. Indeed, the NPI does not capture any sort of narcissism taxon as would be expected if it measured NPD.

A 2020 study found that females scored significantly higher on vulnerable narcissism than males, but no gender differences were found for grandiose narcissism.

Causes 

Although there are no specific causes for NPD, it is described using the biopsychosocial model which describes a combination of risk factors from biological, psychological and socio-environmental factors. This includes but is not limited to genetics, neurobiology, trauma, abuse and parenting.

Genetic 
Evidence suggests there is a high heritability of NPD, with a number of genetic influences indicating varying rates of heritability based on subtype. A number of twin studies historically suggested for the heritability of NPD, including personality disorders in general.

Environment 
Environmental and social factors also influence development of NPD. In some people, vulnerable narcissism (or fragile/covert NPD) may develop from an impaired emotional attachment to primary caregivers (usually parents). That lack of psychological and emotional attachment to a parental figure can result in the child's perception of themselves as unimportant and unconnected to other people, usually, family, community and society. Typically, the child comes to believe that they have a personality defect that makes them unvalued and unwanted. While very little is known about the origins of grandiose narcissism (or its concomitant subtypes of NPD), there it is often suggested that overindulgent, permissive parenting or insensitive and over-controlling parenting are risk factors towards the development of NPD in a child.

In Gabbard's Treatments of Psychiatric Disorders (2014), the following factors are identified as promoting the development of narcissistic personality disorder:

 An oversensitive temperament (individual differences of behavior) at birth
 Excessive admiration that is never balanced with realistic criticism
 Excessive praise for good behaviors, or excessive criticism for bad behaviors in childhood
 Overindulgence and overvaluation by family or peers
 Being praised by adults for perceived exceptional physical appearance or abilities
 Trauma caused by psychological abuse, physical abuse or sexual abuse in childhood
 Unpredictable or unreliable parental caregiving
 Learning the behaviors of psychological manipulation from parents or peers

Moreover, the research reported in "Modernity and Narcissistic Personality Disorders" (2014) indicates that cultural elements also influence the prevalence of NPD, because narcissistic personality traits more commonly occur in modern societies than in traditionalist conservative societies.

Pathophysiology 
Studies of the occurrence of narcissistic personality disorder identified structural abnormalities in the brains of people with NPD, specifically, a lesser volume of gray matter in the left, anterior insular cortex. The results of a 2015 study associated the condition of NPD with a reduced volume of gray matter in the prefrontal cortex. The regions of the brain identified and studied – the insular cortex and the prefrontal cortex – are associated with the human emotions of empathy and compassion, and with the mental functions of cognition and emotional regulation. The neurologic findings of the studies suggest that NPD may be related to a compromised (damaged) capacity for emotional empathy and emotional regulation.

Management 
Treatment for NPD is primarily psychotherapeutic; there is no clear evidence that psychopharmacological treatment is effective for NPD, although it can prove useful for treating comorbid disorders. Psychotherapeutic treatment falls into two general categories: psychoanalytic/psychodynamic and cognitive behavioral. Psychoanalytic therapies include schema therapy, transference focused psychotherapy, mentalization-based treatment and metacognitive psychotherapy. Cognitive behavioral therapies include cognitive behavioral therapy and dialectical behavior therapy. Formats also include group therapy and couples therapy. The specific choice of treatment varies based on individual presentations.

Management of narcissistic personality disorder has not been well studied, however many treatments tailored to NPD exist. Therapy is complicated by the lack of treatment-seeking behavior in people with NPD, despite mental distress. Additionally, people with narcissistic personality disorders have decreased life satisfaction and lower qualities of life, irrespective of diagnosis. People with NPD often present with comorbid mental disorders, complicating diagnosis and treatment. NPD is rarely the primary reason for which people seek mental health treatment. When people with NPD enter treatment (psychologic or psychiatric), they often express seeking relief from a comorbid mental disorder,  including major depressive disorder, a substance use disorder (drug addiction), or bipolar disorder.

Prognosis 

, no treatment guidelines exist for NPD and no empirical studies have been conducted on specific NPD groups to determine efficacy for psychotherapies and pharmacology.

The presence of NPD in patients undergoing psychotherapy for the treatment of other mental disorders is associated with slower treatment progress and higher dropout rates.

Epidemiology 
, overall prevalence is estimated to range from 0.8% to 6.2%. In 2008 under the DSM-IV, lifetime prevalence of NPD was estimated to be 6.2%, with 7.7% for men and 4.8% for women, with a 2015 study confirming the gender difference. In clinical settings, prevalence estimates range from 1% to 15%. The occurrence of narcissistic personality disorder presents a high rate of comorbidity with other mental disorders.

History 
The term "narcissism" comes from a first century (written in the year 8 AD) book by the Roman poet Ovid. Metamorphoses Book III is a myth about two main characters, Narcissus and Echo. Narcissus is a handsome young man who spurns the advances of many potential lovers. When Narcissus rejects the nymph Echo, named this way because she was cursed to only echo the sounds that others made, the gods punish him by making him fall in love with his own reflection in a pool of water. When Narcissus discovers that the object of his love cannot love him back, he slowly pines away and dies.

The concept of excessive selfishness has been recognized throughout history. In ancient Greece, the concept was understood as hubris. It is only since the late 1800s that narcissism has been defined in psychological terms:

Havelock Ellis (1898) was the first psychologist to use the term when he linked the myth to the condition in one of his patients.
Sigmund Freud (1905-1953) used the terms "narcissistic libido" in his Three Essays on the Theory of Sexuality.
Ernest Jones (1913/1951) was the first to construe extreme narcissism as a character flaw.
Robert Waelder (1925) published the first case study of narcissism. His patient was a successful scientist with an attitude of superiority, an obsession with fostering self-respect, and a lack of normal feelings of guilt. The patient was aloof and independent from others and had an inability to empathize with others situations, and was selfish sexually. Waelder's patient was also overly logical and analytical and valued abstract intellectual thought (thinking for thinking's sake) over the practical application of scientific knowledge.

Narcissistic personality was first described by the psychoanalyst Robert Waelder in 1925. The term narcissistic personality disorder (NPD) was coined by Heinz Kohut in 1968. Waelder's initial study has been influential in the way narcissism and the clinical disorder Narcissistic personality disorder are defined today

Freudianism and psychoanalysis 
Much early history of narcissism and NPD originates from psychoanalysis. Regarding the adult neurotic's sense of omnipotence, Sigmund Freud said that "this belief is a frank acknowledgement of a relic of the old megalomania of infancy"; and concluded that: "we can detect an element of megalomania in most other forms of paranoic disorder. We are justified in assuming that this megalomania is essentially of an infantile nature, and that, as development proceeds, it is sacrificed to social considerations."

Narcissistic injury and narcissistic scar are terms used by Freud in the 1920s. Narcissistic wound and narcissistic blow are other, almost interchangeable, terms. When wounded in the ego, either by a real or a perceived criticism, a narcissistic person's displays of anger can be disproportionate to the nature of the criticism suffered; but typically, the actions and responses of the NPD person are deliberate and calculated. Despite occasional flare-ups of personal insecurity, the inflated self-concept of the NPD person is primarily stable.

In The Psychology of Gambling (1957), Edmund Bergler considered megalomania to be a normal occurrence in the psychology of a child, a condition later reactivated in adult life, if the individual takes up gambling. In The Psychoanalytic Theory of Neurosis (1946), Otto Fenichel said that people who, in their later lives, respond with denial to their own narcissistic injury usually undergo a similar regression to the megalomania of childhood.

Narcissistic supply 
Narcissistic supply was a concept introduced by Otto Fenichel in 1938, to describe a type of admiration, interpersonal support, or sustenance drawn by an individual from his or her environment and essential to their self-esteem. The term is typically used in a negative sense, describing a pathological or excessive need for attention or admiration that does not take into account the feelings, opinions, or preferences of other people.

Narcissistic rage 
The term narcissistic rage was a concept introduced by Heinz Kohut in 1972. Narcissistic rage was theorised as a reaction to a perceived threat to a narcissist's self-esteem or self-worth. Narcissistic rage occurs on a continuum from aloofness, to expressions of mild irritation or annoyance, to serious outbursts, including violent attacks.

Narcissistic rage reactions are not necessarily limited to NPD. They may also be seen in catatonic, paranoid delusion, and depressive episodes. It was later suggested that narcissistic people have two layers of rage; the first layer of rage being directed constant anger towards someone else, with the second layer being self-deprecating.

Object relations 
In the second half of the 20th century, in contrast to Freud's perspective of megalomania as an obstacle to psychoanalysis, in the US and UK Kleinian psychologists used the object relations theory to re-evaluate megalomania as a defence mechanism. This Kleinian therapeutic approach built upon Heinz Kohut's view of narcissistic megalomania as an aspect of normal mental development, by contrast with Otto Kernberg's consideration of such grandiosity as a pathological distortion of normal psychological development.

To the extent that people are pathologically narcissistic, the person with NPD can be a self-absorbed individual who passes blame by psychological projection and is intolerant of contradictory views and opinions; is apathetic towards the emotional, mental, and psychological needs of other people; and is indifferent to the negative effects of their behaviors, whilst insisting that people should see them as an ideal person. The merging of the terms "inflated self-concept" and "actual self" is evident in later research on the grandiosity component of narcissistic personality disorder, along with incorporating the defence mechanisms of idealization and devaluation and of denial.

Comparison to other personality disorders 
NPD shares properties with borderline personality disorder, including social stigma, unclear causes and prevalence rates. In a 2020 study, it was argued that NPD is following a similar historical trend to borderline personality disorder: "In the past three decades, enormous progress has been made to elucidate the psychopathology, longitudinal course, and effective treatment for BPD. NPD, which remains as similarly stigmatized and poorly understood as BPD once was, now carries the potential for a new wave of investigation and treatment development."

However, NPD also shares some commonality with the now discredited "multiple personality disorder" (MPD) personality constellation in popular culture and clinical lore. MPD received a high level of mainstream media attention the 1980s, followed by a nearly complete removal from public discourse within the following two decades; this was in part due to thorough debunking many of its propositions and the evident societal harm created by its entry into the legal defence realm. Similar to MPD, NPD has been the subject of high levels of preoccupation in social and popular media forums, without a firm empirical basis despite over a century of description in clinical lore. The NPD label may be misused colloquially and clinically to disparage a target for the purpose of buttressing one's own self-esteem, or other motives that are detrimental for the person receiving the label. Finally, the rise in popular interest in NPD is not accompanied by hypothesized increases in narcissism among recent generations despite widespread assumptions to the contrary.

Controversy 
The extent of controversy about narcissism was on display when the committee on personality disorders for the 5th Edition (2013) of the Diagnostic and Statistical Manual of Mental Disorders recommended the removal of Narcissistic Personality from the manual. A contentious three-year debate unfolded in the clinical community with one of the sharpest critics being John Gunderson, who led the DSM personality disorders committee for the 4th edition of the manual.

The American Psychiatric Association's (APA) formulation, description, and definition of narcissistic personality disorder, as published in the Diagnostic and Statistical Manual of Mental Disorders, Fourth Ed., Text Revision (DSM-IV-TR, 2000), was criticised by clinicians as inadequately describing the range and complexity of the personality disorder that is NPD. That it is excessively focused upon "the narcissistic individual's external, symptomatic, or social interpersonal patterns – at the expense of ... internal complexity and individual suffering", which reduced the clinical utility of the NPD definition in the DSM-IV-TR.

In revising the diagnostic criteria for personality disorders, the work group for the list of "Personality and Personality Disorders" proposed the elimination of narcissistic personality disorder (NPD) as a distinct entry in the DSM-5, and thus replaced a categorical approach to NPD with a dimensional approach, which is based upon the severity of the dysfunctional-personality-trait domains. Clinicians critical of the DSM-5 revision characterized the new diagnostic system as an "unwieldy conglomeration of disparate models that cannot happily coexist", which is of limited usefulness in clinical practice. Despite the reintroduction of the NPD entry, the APA's re-formulation, re-description, and re-definition of NPD, towards a dimensional view based upon personality traits, remains in the list of personality disorders of the DSM-5.

A 2011 study concluded that narcissism should be conceived as personality dimensions pertinent to the full range of personality disorders, rather than as a distinct diagnostic category. In a 2012 literature review about NPD, the researchers concluded that narcissistic personality disorder "shows nosological inconsistency, and that its consideration as a trait domain needed further research would be strongly beneficial to the field." In a 2018 latent structure analysis, results suggested that the DSM-5 NPD criteria fail to distinguish some aspects of narcissism relevant to diagnosis of NPD and subclinical narcissism.

In popular culture
 Suzanne Stone-Maretto, Nicole Kidman's character in the film To Die For (1995), wants to appear on television at all costs, even if this involves murdering her husband. A psychiatric assessment of her character noted that she "was seen as a prototypical narcissistic person by the raters: on average, she satisfied 8 of 9 criteria for narcissistic personality disorder... had she been evaluated for personality disorders, she would receive a diagnosis of narcissistic personality disorder".
 Jay Gatsby, the eponymous character of F. Scott Fitzgerald's novel The Great Gatsby (1925), "an archetype of self-made American men seeking to join high society", has been described as a "pathological narcissist" for whom the "ego-ideal" has become "inflated and destructive" and whose "grandiose lies, poor sense of reality, sense of entitlement, and exploitive treatment of others" conspire toward his own demise.

See also 

 Dark triad, a concept in applied psychology associating personality traits of narcissism with Machiavellianism and psychopathy.

References

Further reading 

 Lowen, Alexander, Narcissism: Denial of the True Self (1984)
 Malkin, Craig, Rethinking Narcissism, Harper Wave 2016
 
 Morrison, Andrew P., Essential Papers on Narcissism (Essential Papers in Psychoanalysis) (1986)
 Morrison, Andrew P., Shame: The Underside of Narcissism (1997)
 Shaw, Daniel, Traumatic Narcissism: Relational Systems of Subjugation (2013)
 Thomas David, Narcissism: Behind the Mask (2010)

Dark triad

Psychoanalytic terminology
Wikipedia medicine articles ready to translate
Wikipedia neurology articles ready to translate